Mohler or Möhler is a surname. Notable people with the surname include:

 Albert Mohler (born 1959), American theologian
 Armin Mohler
 Billy Mohler
 Dana Mohler-Faria
 James L. Mohler
 John R. Mohler Veterinarian and foot-and-mouth disease specialist.
 Johann Adam Möhler 19th century German theologian
 Mike Mohler
 Robert Mohler
Chris Mohler Sculptor